The 2020 Pinatar Cup was the inaugural edition of the Pinatar Cup, an international women's football tournament, consisting of a series of friendly games. It was held in San Pedro del Pinatar, Spain from 4 to 10 March 2020, and featured four teams.

Scotland won the first edition of the tournament.

Format
The four invited teams played a round-robin tournament. Points awarded in the group stage followed the formula of three points for a win, one point for a draw, and zero points for a loss. A tie in points was decided by goal differential.

Teams

Squads

Venues
All the matches were played at the Pinatar Arena in San Pedro del Pinatar.

Standings

Matches
All times are local (UTC+1).

Goalscorers

References

2020 Pinatar Cup
2019–20 in Spanish women's football
2020 in women's association football
Pinatar Cup
March 2020 sports events in Spain